Federica Di Sarra (born 16 May 1990) is an Italian tennis player.

She has a career-high singles ranking of world No. 192, which she achieved on 7 March 2022. Her highest WTA doubles ranking is 186, reached on 20 May 2019. She has won eight singles and 22 doubles titles on the ITF Women's Circuit. 

Di Sarra won a silver medal for Italy at the 2013 Mediterranean Games in Mersin, Turkey in the doubles event, with her teammate Anastasia Grymalska. She also won the bronze medal in the singles competition.

Grand Slam performance timelines

Singles

ITF Circuit finals

Singles: 20 (8 titles, 12 runner–ups)

Doubles: 35 (22 titles, 13 runner–ups)

Notes

References

External links
 

1990 births
Living people
Italian female tennis players
Mediterranean Games medalists in tennis
Mediterranean Games silver medalists for Italy
Mediterranean Games bronze medalists for Italy
Competitors at the 2013 Mediterranean Games
20th-century Italian women
21st-century Italian women